Following are the results of the Ukrainian Football Amateur League 2006 season.  Participation is restricted to the regional (Oblast) champions and/or the most regarded team by the respective regional association. 

This season competition consisted of three stages.  All of the stages were organized in regional principal and was played in two rounds where each team could play another at its home ground except the last one.  The third stage was played in the single round to identify the finalists and the third place contenders. There were six groups in the first stage and four - in the second. The third part, which was the final consisted of two groups. The winners of groups advance to the finals and runners-up match up in the game for the third place.

Teams

Returning
 Elektrometalurh-NZF Nikopol
 Shakhtar Sverdlovsk

Debut
List of teams that are debuting this season in the league.

Sokil Sukhovolia, Tsementnyk Yamnytsia, Iskra-Podillia Teofipol, Khimmash Korosten, Metalurh Malyn, Nyva-Svitanok Vinnytsia, Hran Buzova, Khodak Cherkasy, Shakhtar Konotop, FC Velyka Bahachka, Bryz Izmail, FC Bilyayivka, Lokomotyv Dvorichna

Withdrawn
List of clubs that took part in last year competition, but chose not to participate in 2006 season:

 ODEK Orzhiv
 Yevropa Pryluky
 ZAlK Zaporizhia

 Metalist-UHMK Kyiv
 Kolos Stepove
 HU ZIDMU-Spartak Zaporizhzhia

 FC Nizhyn
 KZEZO Kakhovka

Location map

First stage

Group A

Group B

Group C

Group D

Group E

Group F

Second stage

Group 1

Group 2

Group 3

Group 4

Third stage

Group A

Group B

Final

The game took place in  Lubny, Poltava Oblast. October 1, 2006.

Shakhtar Sverdlovsk - Hran Buzova 1:0 (1:0)

Match for the 3rd place Khodak Cherkasy - Sokil Sukhovolia +:-

Ukrainian Football Amateur League seasons
Amateur
Amateur